John Bartlett (c. 1841 – July 15, 1925) was a mariner and political figure in Newfoundland. He represented Port de Grave in the Newfoundland and Labrador House of Assembly from 1873 to 1874 and from 1882 to 1886.

He was born in Brigus. Bartlett was a master mariner and sealing captain. He transported Robert E. Peary during Peary's early unsuccessful attempts to reach the North Pole. His nephew Robert Bartlett later worked with Peary and was an Arctic explorer in his own right. Bartlett died in Brigus in 1925.

References 
 

Members of the Newfoundland and Labrador House of Assembly
1840s births
1925 deaths
Year of birth uncertain
Newfoundland Colony people